Beyond the Infinite is the third album released by the multi-genre trance group Juno Reactor.

Track listing
All tracks made by Ben Watkins with collaborators mentioned on the track list.

 "Guardian Angel" – 7:11 (with Mike Maguire)
 "Magnetic" – 8:08 (with Paul Jackson)
 "Ice Cube" – 7:03 (with Paul Jackson, Mike Maguire)
 "Feel the Universe" – 7:39 (with Johann Bley, Stephen Holweck, Mike Maguire)
 "Razorback"* – 6:55  (with Mike Maguire, Paul Jackson)
 "Samurai" – 8:17 (with Johann Bley)
 "Silver" – 6:36 (with Mike Maguire)
 "Rotablade" – 8:19 (with Jens Waldebäck)
 "Mars" – 7:10 (with Stephen Holweck, Mike Maguire)
 
 Hypnotic Records (US) release only.

Samples
 The song "Feel the Universe" contains a sample of Kyle MacLachlan murmuring, "I feel the universe functioning perfectly..." This sample is from the 1991 Oliver Stone film The Doors.
 "Rotablade" contains another Kyle MacLachlan sample ("Some thoughts have a certain sound") from the 1984 David Lynch film Dune.
 "Guardian Angel" contains a sample from the 1968 film The Swimmer of Burt Lancaster saying "If there's anything you want, anything at all... come to me. I'll be your guardian angel."
 "Ice Cube" contains a sample of George Sanders as Mr. Freeze from the original Batman series saying "The ice cube crumbles."
 "Silver" contains samples of the 'monkey chant' segment from the 1992 film Baraka.
The trailer for the 1998 film Rasen, the 'forgotten' sequel to Ringu, features a sample of the Guardian Angel song.

Personnel
 Produced by Juno Reactor
 Ben Watkins – producer
 Mike Maguire – co-producer
 Otto The Barbarian – engineering
 Kevin Metcalfe – mastering
 Nahoko Sasada – vocals
 Simon Ghahary – artwork, design
 Simon Watkins – artwork

Use in other media
 Track "Guardian Angel" is the opening theme of the anime series Texhnolyze. It is also used in one of the final battles in the martial arts adventure film Drive.

See also
 Eternity and a Day
 Infinity plus one
 ω+1

References

 JunoReactor.com profile of Beyond the Infinite

1995 albums
Juno Reactor albums
Trance albums